Herbaspirillum frisingense is a nitrogen-fixing bacterium which was found in C4-fibre plants like  prairie cordgrass (Spartina pectinata), Chinese silver grass, (Miscanthus sinensis), Amur silver-grass (Miscanthus sacchariflorus), and  Napier grass (Pennisetum purpureum). The specific name  frisingense comes from Freising, a town in Germany where  H. frisingense was first isolated from prairie cordgrass and Miscanthus plants.

References

External links
Type strain of Herbaspirillum frisingense at BacDive -  the Bacterial Diversity Metadatabase

Burkholderiales
Bacteria described in 2001